Gwio Kura is a town in north-east Yobe State, Nigeria administered by the Bade Local Government. It is located about 50 kilometres south of the border with Niger.

Populated places in Yobe State